Pseudotelphusa incana is a moth of the family Gelechiidae. It is found in North America, where it has been recorded from New York.

The wingspan is 10–12 mm. The forewings are grey, with many off-white scales before the apices and a dark brown to black dot at the base of the fold and a pair of dark dots at one-fourth length, a pair just before middle, and a very small one at end of cell, dots with a few light orange scales preceding and succeeding the brown scales. The hindwings are grey.

The larvae feed on Malus sylvestris.

References

Moths described in 1969
Pseudotelphusa